Tun Abdul Hamid bin Mohamad (born 18 April 1942) is a retired Malaysian lawyer who served as the 5th Chief Justice of Malaysia.

Honours

Honours of Malaysia
  :
 Officer of the Order of the Defender of the Realm (KMN) (1978)
  Grand Commander of the Order of Loyalty to the Crown of Malaysia (SSM) – Tun (2008)
  :
  Knight of the Order of Cura Si Manja Kini (DPCM) – Dato' (1989)
  Grand Knight of the Order of Cura Si Manja Kini (SPCM) – Dato' Seri (2008)
  :
  Companion of the Order of the Defender of State (DMPN) – Dato' (1996)
  Knight Grand Commander of the Order of the Defender of State (DUPN) – Dato' Seri Utama (2008)
  :
  Recipient of the Meritorious Service Medal (PJK) (1974)

References

Living people
1942 births
People from Penang
Malaysian people of Malay descent
Malaysian Muslims
20th-century Malaysian judges
Chief justices of Malaysia
Presidents of the Court of Appeal of Malaysia
Grand Commanders of the Order of Loyalty to the Crown of Malaysia
Officers of the Order of the Defender of the Realm